Seephephe "Mochini" Matete is a Mosotho international footballer. A left-footed attacking midfielder, he is regarded as one of the most gifted footballers produced by Lesotho. He represented Lesotho in the 1974 and 1982 World Cup qualifiers. Matete played his club football for Matlama FC.

In recent years, he has been involved in coaching and as a technical director.

External links
On Lesotho (blog, tribute to Matete)

Living people
Lesotho footballers
Lesotho international footballers
Association footballers not categorized by position
Year of birth missing (living people)
matlama FC players
lesotho national football team managers